Nelemnoye (Nelemney) is a rural locality (a selo), the only inhabited locality, and the administrative center of Nelemninsky National Rural Okrug of Verkhnekolymsky District in the Sakha Republic, Russia, located  from Zyryanka, the administrative center of the district. Its population as of the 2010 Census was 262, of whom 145 were male and 117 female, down from 282 recorded during the 2002 Census.

Etymology
The name of the locality derives from nelma, a kind of fish that the rivers around the locality are rich of.

Kolyma Yukaghirs
Nelemnoye is known for having a significant population of Kolyma Yukaghirs (at the time when the total population of the locality was 296, 168 of them were Yukaghirs). It's the only place to have a Kolyma Yukaghir cultural center and a school where the Southern Yukaghir language is being taught.

The music video for the song "Ulegen Nume" by the Yukaghir singer Irina Duskulova was shot in Nelemnoye.

Nikolai Spiridonov (aka Tekki Odulok), the first Yukaghir writer and scientist, was born in 1906 in Ottur-Kyuyol, near the modern location of Nelemnoye.

References

Notes

Sources
Official website of the Sakha Republic. Registry of the Administrative-Territorial Divisions of the Sakha Republic. Verkhnekolymsky District. 

Rural localities in Verkhnekolymsky District